The Iranian National Ballet Company was Iran's only state ballet institution until the Islamic revolution of 1979 and also the most known and recognized of all dance companies in the Middle East. It was founded in 1958 by the Iranian Ministry of Culture and existed during 21 years (1958–1979). The company, residing at Tehran's Roudaki Hall, was disbanded in the aftermath of the Islamic revolution and was re-established 23 years later in exile by Nima Kiann under the name of Les Ballets Persans in Sweden.

History

Introduction of ballet in Iran 

The history of ballet in Iran started in 1928 when Madame Cornelli, a Russian immigrant who fled the Bolshevik revolution of 1917, started giving dance lessons in Tehran. There was no methodical ballet training; the classes consisted of various exercises to make the body supple and to cultivate the students' awareness of rhythm and musicality. Part of each class was devoted to character or folk dances.  A later dance teacher was Madame Yelena (Avedisian), and Sarkis Djanbazian who respectively in 1933 and 1938 organized dance classes in the city of Tabriz and Qazvin. These newcomers expanded the European influenced dance scene in Iran by holding performances and dance classes of various style, including classical ballet, European folk dancing, the European partner dancing, etc.

Iran’s pioneering ballet company 
In the early 1940s Nilla Cram Cook, who had vast knowledge in Eastern cultures and languages, was serving as the United States cultural attaché at the American Embassy in Tehran. During her time as the US culturаl attaché she became employed at the Ministry of Education and Propaganda, as director general of the Arts Department. Her endeavors and great interest in Persian culture, arts and literature resulted in the realization of the most extensive Iranian national dance project of the first half of the twentieth century. In 1946, Cram Cook founded the Studio of the Revival of the Iranian Ancient Arts (in ), aiming to revive and restore the “forgotten” ancient Iranian performing arts. Most of the dances were based on Persian history or mythology. An important work by Cram Cook, The Caravan, was developed from a poem by  Saadi and was later performed in 1958 by the Iranian National Ballet. The dance troupe performed at functions at the American Embassy in Tehran and toured nationally and internationally, remaining active until around 1953.

Establishment of the national ballet company 
In 1955, Mehrdad Pahlbod, the head of the Fine Arts department commissioned Nejad and Haideh Ahmadzadeh to start a ballet school on a professional basis aiming to raise native Iranian ballet dancers for a future national ballet company. The School was opened in 1956 in the premises of Tehran's Conservatory of Music. Two years later in 1958, the Iranian National Ballet Company was established with Nejad Ahmadzadeh as its founding director. When the Fine Arts Department of Iran eventually expanded and became The Ministry of Culture and Arts, Nejad Ahmadzadeh was appointed as director of the ballet academy, the ballet company and the National and Folk Music, Song and Dance Ensemble which was a sister company to the Iranian National Ballet Company using the same dancers to create and stage a nationally inspired repertoire.

  
As institutionalizing ballet and bringing about a professional national ballet ensemble comparable to the ballet companies in the West had become a serious concern for the government, the Iranian monarch Mohammad Reza Shah Pahlavi had personally asked Dame Ninette de Valois to council on the formation of a ballet company during one of his official visits to London and after a command performance in his honor at the Royal Opera House. In the summer of 1958, Dame Ninette de Valois was visiting Turkey where she had founded a ballet school. On the invitation of the Ministry of Culture and Arts, she prolonged her trip in order to visit the National Ballet Academy of Iran and budding company in Tehran. On her return to London, she sent Ann Cox followed by Miro Michael Zolan and his wife Sandra Vane. Later Nicholas Beriozoff, Marion English-Delanian, Richard Brown and finally Robert and Jacqueline de Warren were sent by de Valois to teach and stage dances and short ballets for the ballet academy and company.

The Iranian National Ballet Company developed to become the most renowned Iranian cultural institution during its tenure as the country's only ballet institution. Company productions were often performed at official events and functions in the presence of the Royal family and invited national and international dignitaries. The company moved to the Roudaki Hall Opera upon its completion in 1967.

Repertoire 

The company repertoire included classical, neoclassical and contemporary ballets which were staged usually by invited guest choreographers and ballet masters from Europe and the United States. The company established a close collaboration with dance institutions in Soviet Union, United States and Europe. The Royal Ballet, Royal Academy of Dance, Bolshoi Ballet, American Ballet Theatre were parts of a vast exchanging cultural program between the companies.

Some early works of the company were those choreographed by Nilla Cram Cook for the Revival of the Iranian Ancient Arts Ensemble which were restaged by Cram Cook's former dancers, Nejad and Haideh Ahmadzadeh. Prominent and world-famous ballet dancers from renowned ballet companies of the world were often invited to dance the principal roles of all great classical ballets. In order to keep the high standard of the productions the company relied on guest artists from abroad to perform the leading roles in most work premieres.

List of Iranian National Ballet Company productions

Artistic staff 
 
The Iranian National Ballet Company started operating in 1958 with a dozen of dancers. The company grew to approximately 50 dancers, one third of them Iranian natives. The rest of the company members came mostly from Europe and the United States.

Artistic directors 

Nejad Ahmadzadeh (1958–1976)
Ali Pourfarrokh (1976–1979)

Principal choreographers 

William Dollar (1958–1960)
Miro Zolan (1961–1963)
Richard Brown (1963–1964)
Jack Carter (1971)
Anne Heaton (1973)
Haideh Ahmadzadeh
Robert Urazgildiev (1975)
Birgit Cullberg (1975)
Nicholas Beriosoff (1976–1979)
John Butler

Ballet masters and mistresses 

William Dollar
Miro Zolan
Sandra Vane
Yvonne Patterson (1959–1960)
Marian English Delanian (1960 -1979)
Robert de Warren (1965-1970)
Jacqueline de Warren (1965–1970)
Dudley Davies (1977–1979)
Kenneth Mason (1976-1979)

Dancers 

Ayda Abolian
Avak Abrahamian (Salmasi) (? - 1979)
Valerik Abrahamian (? - 1979)
Ahmad Adjdadi
Adeleh Afrand
Haideh Ahmadzadeh (1958–1975)
Parvin Al-Amin
Ronald K. Alexander
Anne Allen (1978–1979)
Jeremy Allen (1976 - 1979)
Avisa Amirshahi
Jenous Amirshahi
Mary Apick
Ahita Ardalan
Azita Arfa
Wendy Arshamian (? - 1979)
Minoo Atabaki
Clara Avanessian
Ophelia Azarnia
Banafsheh Bahramian
Georgina Bahramian Coleman (? - 1979)
Nejdeh Bahramian (? - 1979)
James Bailey (1977–1978)
Evelyn Balassanian (? - 1979)
Mitra Behrouz
Diana Biggart
Nina Brzorad (1976–1979)
Pippa Buck Power
Aban Budin
Margaret Bull
Judyth Casey
Haydeh Changizian (1972–1978)
Tina Christina 
Robert Craset (1977–1979)
Michael Dane
Belinda (Lindy) Davies (? - 1979)
Rosamund Davies
Otis Daye (1977–1978)
Rostam Dehmohbed
Missy Denman (? - 1978)
Yerjanik Djambazian
Mehdi Doagoo
Gavin Dorrian (1978–1979)
Tomas Edwards (Martini) (? - 1978)
Magdy El-Lethy (? - 1979)
Jonathan Ellingham (1977–1979)
Bahman Sadr Erfan
Hilda Estepanian
Fereshteh Fakoor
Fereshteh Farazmand
Ivan Ionathan Feller
Martin Fredmann
Parviz Ghanei (? - 1979)
Farihan (Fari) Gheissari Akbarian
Diane Gray (? - 1979)
Michael Hall
Mark Hammond (1977–1978)
Mary Heathcote
Caroline Heming (1977 - 1978)
Dariush Hirbodian
Behrooz Honarbakhsh
Sarah Inglis Fricker (1970-1974)
David Jackson (1976 - 1978)
Nader Jahanfard
Sarvar (Sorur) Kaboli
Nina Kavosi
Nasser Kazemi
Sudabeh Keshmirian
Sholeh Katherina Kia
Shideh Kia Nikkhoo (? - 1979)
Ladan Kianpoor
Jeremy Macdonald (1977–1978)
Osama Maksood (1978–1979)
Robert March (1976–1977)
Debbie McGee (1978–1979)
Sam McManus
Terri Mills Tester
Frieda Minassian
Golriz Mirjahangiri
Nader Mirzadeh
Rima Moghadam
Farnoosh Moshiri
Abdollah Nazemi
Leon Neshanian
Jaleh Nikpay
Judith (Judy) Odell (1976 - 1978)
Karen Oram
Gita Ostovani
Gregory Pope (1977–1978)
Mary Paranicas (1977–1978)
Janet Popeleski (1976 - 1978)
Virginia (Ginny) Portz
Tibor Pusztai - Conductor
Mina Rad
Chinko Rafique (? - 1977)
Jaleh Rahbar
Soheyla Razavi (? - 1979)
Patricia Renzetti (1978–1979)
Helen Riddington (1976 - 1978)
Amanda Rivera Bruell (?-1978)
Vivien Rycroft Richards (? - 1979)
Soheila Sadr
Jamshid Saghabashi (1958–1979)
Fereydoon Saghabashi Tork
Maggie (Burton) Saghabashi (? - 1979)
Pari Samar
Bahareh Sardari (? - 1979)
John (Jay) Seaman (1977–1979)
Susan Sepehran
Roberta Senn Minto (1977–1978)
Karen Smith (1977–1978)
Azar Snider
Sacha Spencer-Moore
Diane Spinelli
Clair Symonds Josephs
Amin Taati
Mersedeh Tahvildari
Mary Tarverdian
Kent Taylor (1978)
Peggy Tehran
Catherine Terzian
Mark Thibodeau (1977–1978)
Peter Towse (? - 1978)
Behrooz Vasseghi (? - 1978)
Samuel Veal (1976 - 1978)
Ali Aschar Vil
Bethan Wiliams (1977–1978)
Trevor Wood
Wendy Woodbridge (1977–1978)
Jennifer (Jenny) Wyatt  (1974–1979)
Nazila Zand-Karimi
Vazgen Zarokian
Pejman Parhami (1975-1977)

Disbanding of the company 

The civil unrest and political upheavals that caused the collapse of the Monarchy and establishment of a theocracy in Iran started in 1978 and was escalating rapidly. The last ballet production that was staged at the Roudaki Hall Opera was Sleeping Beauty during the fall season of 1978. By December 1978 and January 1979 the political situation of the country became more and more unstable. Almost all foreign members of the company left Iran during this period as soon as there was a flight available, before the complete collapse of the regime in February 1979. Employed dancers were informed that there were dismissed till the new government's further notice. Eventually, a meeting was arranged in Bāgh-e Manzariyeh in northern Tehran soon after the victorious revolution in the presence of Roudaki Hall's workforce and Ayatollah Mohammad Mofatteh. When he was asked about the fate of ballet in Iran, he replied irately and in no uncertain terms that Islamic Republic and ballet is paradoxical and self-contradictory. The Iranian National Ballet Company was thereafter formally declared as dissolved in 1979.

Revival of the Iranian National Ballet Company in Les Ballets Persans 

Twenty-three years after disbanding of the Iranian National Ballet, the Swedish-Iranian dancer, and choreographer Nima Kiann created a new company in Stockholm, Sweden with the support of the Swedish authorities. Inspired by Les Ballets Russes and Ballets suédois as exiled dance companies representing vastly the culture of their countries, he named the company Les Ballets Persans. The company repertory is entirely based on the Persian culture and heritage and does not include any works of the Western repertoire unless they are created based on Persian heritage. The project of revival of the Iranian National Ballet Company made an international impact and was regarded as the most extensive individual artistic project ever realized outside of Iran.

Notes 

On the 35th anniversary of disbanding of the company, on August 29, 2014, around forty former members of the Iranian National Ballet, including Nejad and Haideh Ahmadzadeh and Ali Pourfarrokh, gathered together in Washington DC to celebrate and share the accomplishments of the company. This was the first reunion of company members after leaving Tehran thirty-five years ago. In a message sent to this reunion,  Nima Kiann the founder of Les Ballets Persans, the successor company of the Iranian National Ballet, wrote:    ...On behalf of the new generation of Iranian ballet artists, I salute all attending and even absent members of the company this evening. Your collective accomplishment of the past time is today’s fundament on which this new generation is standing on. It is a reason of pride for the new and future generations of Iranians and a reminder of a passed time of development and progress for the art form of dance in Iran.

See also 

Vahdat Hall
Les Ballets Persans
 Official website of Nima Kiann

References 

 Bibliography

External links 
Chronology of the Iranian National Ballet and Les Ballets Persans
Official website of Les Ballets Persans
Ali Pourfarrokh

Ballet companies
Performing groups established in 1958
1958 establishments in Iran
Ballet in Iran